Andrew Sorbie Haddow (8 April 1903 – 1979) was a Scottish professional footballer who played as an inside forward.

References

Footballers from North Lanarkshire
Scottish footballers
Association football forwards
Burnley F.C. players
New York Nationals (ASL) players
Clyde F.C. players
Dundee United F.C. players
Ballymena United F.C. players
English Football League players
American Soccer League (1921–1933) players
Scottish Football League players
NIFL Premiership players
Greenock Morton F.C. players
1903 births
Date of death missing
1979 deaths
Scottish expatriate sportspeople in the United States
Expatriate soccer players in the United States
Scottish expatriate footballers
People from Cumbernauld